is a town located in Saitama Prefecture, Japan. , the town had an estimated population of 6,838 in 2894 households and a population density of 220 persons per km2. The Nagatoro River is well known for its rapids and whitewater rafting and boating, and the entire town is designated as a prefectural nature park and preserve.

Geography
Located in the mountains of western Saitama Prefecture, Nagatoro is on the upper reaches of the Arakawa River.

Surrounding municipalities
 Saitama Prefecture
 Honjō
 Misato
 Yorii
 Minano

Climate
Nagatoro has a humid continental climate (Köppen Cfa) characterized by warm summers and cool winters with light snowfall.  The average annual temperature in Nagatoro is 12.8 °C. The average annual rainfall is 2222 mm with September as the wettest month. The temperatures are highest on average in August, at around 24.1 °C, and lowest in January, at around 1.6 °C.

Demographics
Per Japanese census data, the population of Nagatoro has declined modestly in recent decades.

History
The village of Nagami was created within Chichibu District, Saitama with the establishment of the modern municipalities system on April 1, 1889, and was elevated to town status on February 15, 1940. The town absorbed neighboring Higuchi and part of Shiratori villages on September 8, 1943, and changed its name to Nagatoro on November 1, 1971. In February 1955, the town expanded by annexing the neighboring villages of Orihara, Hachigata, Obusuma, and Yodo.

Government
Nagatoro has a mayor-council form of government with a directly elected mayor and a unicameral town council of 10 members. Nagatoro, together with the towns of Higashichichibu, Minano, Ogano and Yokoze, contributes one member to the Saitama Prefectural Assembly. In terms of national politics, the town is part of Saitama 11th district of the lower house of the Diet of Japan.

Economy
The main source of income for Nagatoro is tourism-related industries.

Education
Nagatoro has two public elementary schools and one public middle school operated by the town government. The town does not have a high school.

Transportation

Railway
 Chichibu Railway  - Chichibu Main Line
 Higuchi - Nogami - Nagatoro - Kami-Nagatoro
Hodosan Ropeway

Highway

Local attractions
Nagatoro Gorge

References

External links

Official Website 
Nagatoromachi Tourist Association
Area Tourism Organization

 
Towns in Saitama Prefecture
Chichibu District, Saitama